Andrew Jones may refer to:

Politicians
Andrew Jones (Australian politician) (1944–2015), Australian politician
Andrew Jones (British politician) (born 1963), British politician
Andrew Jones (fl. 1386), MP for Cricklade
Andrew Jones (Alabama politician), Republican member of the Alabama Senate

Sports

Cricket
Andrew Jones (cricket administrator) (born 1972), current CEO of Cricket NSW
Andrew Jones (Australian cricketer) (born 1964), Australian cricketer
Andrew Jones (New Zealand cricketer) (Andrew Howard Jones, born 1959), New Zealand test cricketer, played for Central Districts Stags, Otago Volts and Wellington Firebirds
Andrew Jones (Welsh cricketer) (Andrew James Jones, born 1972), former Welsh cricketer, played for Wales Minor Counties
Andrew Jones (Staffordshire cricketer) (Andrew James Jones, born 1977), former English cricketer, played for Staffordshire
Andrew Jones (Somerset cricketer) (Andrew Paul Jones, born 1964), former English cricketer, played for Somerset

Other sports
Andrew Jones (basketball) (born 1997), American basketball player
Andrew Jones (Canadian football) (born 1982), Canadian football player
Andrew Jones (racing driver) (born 1980), Australian racing driver
Andi Jones (born 1978), English athlete

Others
Andrew Lee Jones (1955–1991), American executed for murder
Andrew Jones (artist), American visual artist
Andrew Jones (Medal of Honor) (1835–?), American Civil War sailor and Medal of Honor recipient
Andrew Jones (historian) (1944–), British historian
Andrew Jones (filmmaker) (1983–2023), British screenwriter and director
Andrew R. Jones, visual effects artist, winner of the Academy Award for Best Visual Effects for Avatar
Andrew "Jr. Boy" Jones (born 1948), American blues guitarist
Andrew Jones (priest) (born 1961), Church in Wales priest

See also
Andruw Jones (born 1977), Curaçaon former baseball player
Druw Jones (born 1993), American baseball player
Andy Jones (disambiguation)